Louis Guittar (alternatively spelled Lewis Gittar, died 13 November 1700) was a French pirate active in the Caribbean, the West Indies, and New England during the late 1690s and 1700s.

History

Based in St. Malo in the late 1690s, Guittar commanded the 28-gun sloop La Paix attacked  merchant shipping in the Caribbean and Mid-Atlantic area.

In early 1700, after plundering and sinking five merchant ships in Chesapeake Bay, he was expecting only the elderly Essex Prize guardship, but was surprised to find instead the fifth-rate frigate HMS Shoreham under Captain William Passenger. The Shoreham had arrived in April 1700 in response to pirate John James looting a number of vessels in the area and forcing the outgunned Essex Prize to retreat. After Guittar chased the remaining merchantman into Lynnhaven Bay, Virginia on May 3, 1700, Virginia Governor General Francis Nicholson accompanied Passenger aboard the Shoreham, reportedly standing on the foredeck throughout the fight.

Although evenly matched, with Passenger's 115 crew and 28 guns to the Guittar's crew consisting of between 150 and 160 sailors and 20 mounted guns (with eight more in the hold), Guittar was forced to surrender after a 12-hour battle. Guittar threatened to blow up La Paix's powder magazine, killing almost 50 prisoners, if he didn't receive quarter and a pardon. Nicholson granted the pirates quarter but referred them to King William of England for trial. With 26 men killed, HMS Shoreham took on the surviving crew members, of which more than half were wounded. Transferred to England, Guittar and 23 of his crew were tried for piracy and hanged in London several months later.

See also
 Canoot - another French pirate active off the New England coast.

Further reading
 Middleton, Arthur Pierce. Tobacco Coast: A Maritime History of Chesapeake Bay in the Colonial Era. Newport News, Virginia: Mariners' Museum, 1953.
 See Jameson's Privateering and Piracy in the Colonial Period, pages 259-275 (sections 91–101) for an extensive list of depositions and testimony, as well as letters between Passenger and Nicholson and others regarding the actions involving La Paix.

References
 Earle, Peter. The Pirate Wars. New York: St. Martin's Press, 2005. 
 Peabody & Essex Museum. The American Neptune. Salem, Massachusetts: Peabody Museum of Salem, 1941.

External links
The Virginian-Pilot: Tombstone Recalls Victim of Bloody Naval Battle
Virginia Colonial Records Project

Year of birth missing
1700 deaths
French pirates
18th-century pirates
17th-century pirates
People executed for piracy
Caribbean pirates